Caozhou or Cao Prefecture was a zhou (prefecture) in imperial China centering on modern Heze or Cao County in Shandong, China. It existed (intermittently) from the 6th century to 1913.

Geography
Under the Sui, Cao Prefecture included Yuanqu County. The administrative region of Caozhou in the Tang dynasty is in the border region of modern southwestern Shandong and eastern Henan. It probably includes parts of modern: 
 Under the administration of Heze, Shandong:
 Heze
 Cao County
 Dingtao County
 Chengwu County
 Dongming County
 Under the administration of Shangqiu, Henan:
 Minquan County

References
 

Prefectures of the Sui dynasty
Prefectures of the Tang dynasty
Prefectures of the Song dynasty
Prefectures of the Jin dynasty (1115–1234)
Prefectures of the Ming dynasty
Prefectures of the Qing dynasty
Former prefectures in Henan
Former prefectures in Shandong